Bradley Lee Gulden (born June 10, 1956) is an American former professional baseball player. He played as a catcher in Major League Baseball (MLB) between 1978 to 1986 for the Los Angeles Dodgers, New York Yankees, Seattle Mariners, Montreal Expos, Cincinnati Reds, and San Francisco Giants.

Baseball career and the original Humm-Baby
Gulden was born in New Ulm, Minnesota and graduated from Chaska High School near Minneapolis–Saint Paul. He was drafted by the Los Angeles Dodgers in the 17th round of the 1975 Major League Baseball draft. In 1978 he played for the Albuquerque Dukes of the Pacific Coast League, appearing in 125 games and produced a .294 batting average along with 8 home runs and 72 runs batted in. His performance earned him a late-season promotion to the major leagues where, he made his debut on September 22, 1978 at the age of 22. 

On February 15, 1979, the Los Angeles Dodgers traded Gulden to the New York Yankees for Gary Thomasson. His offensive production declined in 1979, hitting for a .248 batting average along with 6 home runs and 34 runs batted in while playing for the Columbus Clippers of the International League. On August 3, during the Yankees' first game after the death of Thurman Munson in an airplane crash the previous day, Gulden replaced starting catcher Jerry Narron in the ninth inning.  Gulden started on August 6 in the team's first game after Munson's funeral, only to be replaced himself in the ninth by Narron.

Gulden holds a place in Major League Baseball trivia by being one of four players in history to be traded for himself, along with Harry Chiti, Dickie Noles, and John McDonald. In , the New York Yankees sent him to the Seattle Mariners with $150,000 for a player to be named and Larry Milbourne. In May , the Mariners sent Gulden back to the Yankees as the player to be named. This kind of swap happened to Gulden again, as he was traded by the Yankees in April 1982 for catcher Bobby Ramos — only to be sold back to the Yankees after the season. Meanwhile Ramos was sold back to the Expos.

At the beginning of the 1986 season Gulden was with the San Francisco Giants and fighting for a roster spot behind Bob Brenly and Bob Melvin. His hustle and work ethic inspired manager Roger Craig to nickname him a “Humm Baby”, because “he didn't have a lot of talent, but he gave you 180 percent; that's the way Brad (was). Humm-baby.” Gulden made the team as the third-string catcher, and Humm-Baby spread from only Gulden until it applied to the entire Giants team, and it eventually became synonymous with Roger Craig. He appeared in his final major league game with the Expos on September 28, 1986 at the age of 30. Gulden played in fewer than 10 games in three of his seven major league seasons and finished with a batting average of .200.

References

External links
  
Boxscore for August 3, 1979: https://www.baseball-reference.com/boxes/NYA/NYA197908030.shtml
Boxscore for August 6, 1979: https://www.baseball-reference.com/boxes/NYA/NYA197908060.shtml
Humm-Baby Article - Original Coin of the Humm-Baby 20th Anniversary Article

1956 births
Living people
Albuquerque Dukes players
American expatriate baseball players in Canada
Baseball players from Minnesota
Bellingham Dodgers players
Cincinnati Reds players
Columbus Clippers players
Danville Dodgers players
Denver Zephyrs players
Lodi Dodgers players
Los Angeles Dodgers players
Major League Baseball third basemen
Montreal Expos players
Nashville Sounds players
New York Yankees players
People from New Ulm, Minnesota
Phoenix Firebirds players
San Francisco Giants players
Seattle Mariners players
Spokane Indians players
Tucson Toros players
Wichita Aeros players